Gretchena is a genus of moths belonging to the subfamily Olethreutinae of the family Tortricidae.

Species
Gretchena amatana Heinrich, 1923
Gretchena bolliana (Slingerland, 1896)
Gretchena concitatricana (Heinrich, 1923)
Gretchena concubitana Heinrich, 1923
Gretchena delicatana Heinrich, 1923
Gretchena deludana (Clemens, 1864)
Gretchena dulciana Heinrich, 1923
Gretchena garai Miller, 1987
Gretchena nymphana Blanchard & Knudson, 1983
Gretchena obsoletana Brown, 1982
Gretchena ochrantennae Razowski & Wojtusiak, 2006
Gretchena semialba McDunnough, 1925
Gretchena watchungana (Kearfott, 1907)

See also
List of Tortricidae genera

References

External links
tortricidae.com

Eucosmini
Tortricidae genera